John Tinker is an American television producer and writer. He is the co-creator of the CBS drama Judging Amy and has been an Executive Producer and Writer on American television shows such as NBC's iconic St. Elsewhere, the CBS drama Chicago Hope, the ABC drama The Practice, and the NBC drama The Book of Daniel. Recently, he developed the television series Chesapeake Shores for the Hallmark Channel and was the Executive Producer and Co-Writer on the Hallmark Hall of Fame movie, Love Locks. Tinker won the 1986 Emmy Award for Outstanding Writing in a Drama Series for the St. Elsewhere episode "Time Heals" which he co-wrote with Tom Fontana and John Masius. He has received numerous Emmy Award nominations and Humanitas Award nominations.

He currently is the showrunner/writer/executive producer of When Calls the Heart.

He is the son of television executive Grant Tinker and his first wife, Ruth Byerly.

Tinker is married to best-selling Southern author and syndicated columnist, Ronda Rich.

References

External links
 
 

1958 births
Living people
Emmy Award winners
Place of birth missing (living people)
American television writers
American male television writers
American television producers
Middlebury College alumni